Miss Island Queen is a faʻafafine pageant held annually in American Samoa. It is noted for being the longest standing pageant of its kind in the South Pacific. It was first held in 1979 before undergoing a series of changes. No pageant was held in 1980 and 1982 as it endured shifts in ownership. It was canceled in 1986 due to a tropical cyclone and ceased again in 1999 and 2002 when it struggled with funding. In 1996 It was held simultaneously on the same evening as another faʻafafine pageant Empress of Samoa. In 2008 the pageant coincided with the Festival of Pacific Arts and became the closing event of festivities. After undergoing extensive reestablishment in 2010 the pageant has since been held during Flag Day week and broadcast live on KVZK-2. It is now known as Miss SOFIAS and maintains yearly advocacy and charity programs.

History

The pageant began as a marketing show for Herb & Sia's motel a family owned business, in its heyday it was a staple for Polynesian revues and local musicians. A gathering of faʻafafines shepherd by educators Leroy Lutu and Vena Sele led to pioneering the first fully organized beauty pageant in 1981. It came to prominence in the late 1980s when organizers incorporated educational awareness, community service and charitable causes in both American Samoa and neighboring Apia, Samoa. Governor A. P. Lutali was the first territorial leader to officially support the pageant in 1987 in years that followed numerous local dignitaries and politicians became fixtures at the event. The pageant was hugely successful by 1990 it spawned a faʻafafine performance troupe. The troupe entertained across the islands at public ceremonies and private events popularizing a streak of song and dance routines among them the apartheid anthem Gimme Hope Jo'anna, music from the soundtrack of Sarafina! and Samba in the night by Daniel Rae Costello many selections were opening themes of past island queen pageants. Power struggles corrupted the pageant in the mid-1990s resulting in the exploitation of faʻafafines in countless beauty pageants publicized for financial gain. Vena Sele and Leroy Lutu harbored creative differences and parted ways. Lutu went on to establish "Empresses of Samoa" and "Mizz Corona" pageants and Sele continued with Island Queens before leading "Miss American Sevens". American Sevens was originally operated under a netball association but at the height of its success became known as Seven Islands of American Samoa.

In the 2000s Miss American Sevens and Miss Island Queens pageants dominated the territory. In 2010 American Sevens and Island Queens communally retired uniting to become S.O.F.I.A.S (Society of Faʻafafine in American Samoa). Organizers also preserved history honoring past winners under its retooled name. Three distinctive awards were awarded during the history of both pageants. In 2000 high chief Tiumalu Sia Scanlan was presented with a special award, in 2006 longtime serving member Rosie Moimoi was recognized by Island Queens and in 2005 founder Vena Sele was honored by the American Sevens for her legacy and service to both the faʻafafine community and her pioneering career. Sele was the first fa'afafine to earn a doctorate degree, for a short term Sele was president of American Samoa Community College becoming the highest ranking fa'afafine at the time. Sele retired in 2005 and in 2007 published her autobiography "Memoirs of a Samoan, Catholic and Fa’afafine". Sele is widely known to have inspired many fa'afafines to pursue education many of whom affectionately call her "Mama". Sele lives in Tacoma, WA. Leroy Lutu rose to great success with the Department of Education and retired in 2011. He was a popular local personality well known for his fashionable taste and socialite status. In 2008 both Sele and Lutu returned for the 25th anniversary of Miss Island Queens it was their last time together on stage. Lutu died in 2012.

Notable Contestants & Winners

 Cindy Filo was 3rd runner up in 1987’s Miss Island Queen. Filo became “Cindy of Samoa”  Samoa's first ever faʻafafine celebrity attracting tourism and fans for her drag revues in Apia. Filo toured her shows across the South Pacific and the United States. Cindy was profiled in Heather Croall’s 1999 documentary Paradise Bent: Boys Will Be Girls in Samoa. In 2008 Cindy was a finalist on the New Zealand reality show Stars in Their Eyes. She is profiled in Te Ara: The Encyclopedia of New Zealand section on faʻafafine.
  Michelle Eneliko  was a prolific local educator who was 1st runner-up for Miss Island Queen 1990. Eneliko was among the fatality victims of the Samoa tsunami that devastated the Samoan islands on September 29, 2009.
  Miss Island Queen 1993, Shalimar (Atisone Seiuli) gained national media exposure in 1997 when she was arrested while in the company of Hollywood star Eddie Murphy. The incident was publicized by tabloid magazines, TV shows and parodied on Mad TV and SNL resulting in several lawsuits brought on by Murphy and his lawyers. Seiuli died in Los Angeles reportedly in an accidental fall from her apartment building in 1998. In 2003 the scandal was ranked #61 on E! TV's "The Greatest Shocking Moments in Entertainment History".
 Rachael Ng Lam Miss Island Queen 1995 appeared in the 2011 sequel to the popular Samoan film “Tautoga Gaosia” playing herself.
  Miss Island Queen 1992 Loata Sipili is currently the highest ranking faʻafafine in American Samoa. Sipili is the only locally Certified Diabetes Educator (CDE) and administers the diabetes care and prevention clinic within LBJ Tropical Medical Center the territory’s only hospital.
 Marsha Mageo, Shevon Matai, Shalimar Seiuli, Trisyss Ali & Samayah Jackson were all teenagers during their reign. Island Queens later adapted new regulations restricting eligibility.
Shevon Matai, Tasha Atio'o, Lydia Risati & Marion Mageo were all crowned twice as both Miss Island Queen & Miss American 7's 
 Pearl Mata'u is the oldest winner she was 40 when she won in 2003. Mata'u also holds the record for being the longest competitor a total of 10 times in the span of three decades.
 Tasha Atio'o and  Rexene Yandall  are the only past winners to win pageant titles in American Samoa and Samoa.
Marion Malena Mageo Miss Island Queen 2005 & Miss American 7's 2007 is noted as a multiple pageant winner winning more than 8 titles in both American Samoa and the Mainland.
 Miss Island Queen 2008  Princess Auva'a is a local movie actress . Auva'a starred in  "Heart to Heart" and Seki A Oe: A Crazy Samoan Love Story, both filmed and produced in American Samoa & is serving in the US Army.  
Miss SOFIAS 2017 Eden Brown was the winner of the 2014 "Le Leo O Amerika Samoa"
Ara-Lei Mahealani Yandall 2nd Runner Up in 2010 & 1st Runner Up in 2018 at the Miss SOFIAS Pageant was crowned as the 9th Miss UTOPIA International.
Miss Island Queen 2000 Agalelei Fatuesi became the first Faʻafafine to campaign for Public Office in the 2018 Election.
Miss SOFIAS 2013 Roberta Laumoli became the first Trans Fashion Designer to Showcase her creations & designs at the 2019 London Pacific Fashion Week representing American Samoa

Past winners

 List of former Miss Island Queen titleholders

 S.O.F.I.A.S. is established

 List of former Miss American Sevens titleholders

Runners-Up [Miss SOFIAS Title]

References

External links
 Autobiography of prominent Samoan fa'afafine educator Dr. Vena Sele
 
 2008 pageant photos
 2009 pageant photos

Gender in Oceania
Transgender in Oceania
Transgender beauty pageants
American Samoan culture